Internet Group do Brasil (iG) is a Brazilian Internet service provider that owns and operates web portals and provides a variety of services, including news, shopping and stock information. iG offered free e-mail accounts until 2016.

At the time it was bought in March 2012, iG was the fifth-largest portal in Brazil, with 23.5 million unique monthly visitors.

History
iG was founded on January 9, 2000, by GP Investments and Banco Opportunity. It gained popularity by offering free dial-up access.

In May 2004, Brasil Telecom (then a subsidiary of Oi since 2009) acquired iG for approximately $100 million. In April 2012, Oi sold iG to Portuguese investment company Ongoing Strategy Investments SGPS SA for an undisclosed sum.

See also
 List of internet service providers in Brazil

References

Companies based in São Paulo
Internet service providers of Brazil
Internet technology companies of Brazil